Ian "Bobby" Hill (born 9 February 2000) is an Australian rules footballer who plays for the Collingwood Football Club in the Australian Football League (AFL).

Early life

Hill is an Indigenous  man with Whadjuk-Ballardong Noongar ancestry. Named after his father, Hill prefers to be called Bobby. Hill attended Northam Senior High School before completing his high school education at Wesley College (Western Australia) as part of their Indigenous Scholarship Program. He first came to notice when he was selected in the Western Australia under 16s.

AFL career
He was selected at pick #24 in the 2018 national draft. He made his senior debut against Richmond in round 17 of the 2019 season. 
Hill has played 41 games with the club and is known for his blistering pace, clean hands and the ability to leap in the air after the football. Hill designed the 's 2020 Indigenous jumper, which is worn by the club as an alternative strip.

Health issues
In May 2022 Hill was diagnosed with testicular cancer. He had surgery and spent the rest of the year recovering.

Extended family
Hill is the cousin of Bradley and Stephen Hill. Another one of his cousins is Gerald Ugle, one of the inaugural GWS players.

Statistics
Updated to the end of the 2022 season.

|-
| 2019 ||  || 37
| 8 || 7 || 5 || 49 || 29 || 78 || 18 || 22 || 0.9 || 0.6 || 6.1 || 3.6 || 9.8 || 2.3 || 2.8
|- 
| 2020 ||  || 37
| 5 || 4 || 5 || 28 || 15 || 43 || 10 || 11 || 0.8 || 1.0 || 5.6 || 3.0 || 8.6 || 2.0 || 2.2
|-
| 2021 ||  || 37
| 17 || 14 || 12 || 113 || 41 || 154 || 33 || 48 || 0.8 || 0.7 || 6.6 || 2.4 || 9.1 || 1.9 || 2.8
|-
| 2022 ||  || 37
| 11 || 9 || 8 || 62 || 32 || 94 || 24 || 24 || 0.8 || 0.7 || 5.6 || 2.9 || 8.5 || 2.2 || 2.2
|- class=sortbottom
! colspan=3 | Career
! 41 !! 34 !! 30 !! 252 !! 117 !! 369 !! 85 !! 105 !! 0.8 !! 0.7 !! 6.1 !! 2.9 !! 9.0 !! 2.1 !! 2.6
|}

Notes

References

External links

Bobby Hill from AFL Tables

Greater Western Sydney Giants players
Australian rules footballers from Western Australia
Perth Football Club players
2000 births
Living people
Indigenous Australian players of Australian rules football